The Automuseum Dr. Carl Benz is a privately owned automobile museum in Ladenburg, Baden-Württemberg, Germany. Established in 1984, it focuses on the career of the automotive pioneer Carl Benz (also known as Karl Benz), and on the history of the automobile manufacturers associated with him.  Since 2005, the museum has been housed in a former factory building used from 1908 to produce automobiles under the "C. Benz Söhne" brand.

See also
List of automobile museums
Mercedes-Benz Museum
Museum for Historical Maybach Vehicles

References

Notes

Bibliography

External links

  

Buildings and structures in Ladenburg
Automobile museums in Germany
Mercedes-Benz
Museums in Baden-Württemberg
Rhein-Neckar-Kreis
Karl Benz
Museums established in 1984
1984 establishments in Germany